The Second Battle of Guilin was fought between the invading Hunan Army, allied to the forces of Chiang Kai-shek, and the forces of the New Guangxi clique personally commanded by Li Zongren. Li was facing a second invasion by the forces of the Yunnan Army (also allied to Chiang Kai-shek) targeted at Nanning. Li was forced to withdraw his forces from Guilin.

Bibliography
中華民國國防大學編，《中國現代軍事史主要戰役表》
Conflicts in 1930